NWD1, short for NACHT and WD repeat domain containing 1, is a gene found in vertebrates, which encodes a protein that contains a NACHT domain and a WD40 repeat domain.  It was originally identified during a search for immune system genes in zebrafish as a protein coding sequence related to APAF1; orthologs were subsequently identified in mammalian species.  The NWD1 gene of humans is located on chromosome 19.  Current data suggests a causal role for tumor-associated over-expression of NWD1 in the dysregulation of androgen receptor signaling during prostate cancer progression.

References

Further reading

Animal genes
Genes on human chromosome 19